Kunhippalli  is a place in Chombal near Mahe district, in the Union territory of Puducherry in India.

Kunhipalli has a masjid called Saidar masjid  where  Zainuddin Makhdoom II (Arabic:شيخ زيندين مخدوم) burial place situated under a tree who died in 1583 AD. The place has a wall boundary in the front of Kunji Palli, neither tomb nor epithet declares Sheikh's glorious past. A board in Malayalam language inscribed his name has been hung near his burial place. Fat'h Ul Mueen, a textbook on Fiqh dealing with the Shafi'i school of Islamic jurisprudence, is one of the greatest works of Sheikh Zainuddin Makhdoom 2. His "Tuhfat al-Mujahidin" is a pioneering historical work dealing with the struggles of the Malabar Muslims against the Portuguese incursion in India. This work was first written in Arabic in the late 16th century based on the author’s first-hand information of events and what he could gather from sources. In this book the author strongly encourages the people of Kerala, both Muslims and Non-Muslims to fight against Portuguese incursion in India.

External links
   Zainuddin Makhdoom 2 's brief biography,

Villages in Mahe district